The 1964 United States presidential election in Oregon took place on November 3, 1964, as part of the 1964 United States presidential election. Voters chose six representatives, or electors, to the Electoral College, who voted for president and vice president.

Oregon was won by incumbent President Lyndon B. Johnson (D–Texas), with 63.72% of the popular vote, against Senator Barry Goldwater (R–Arizona), with 35.96% of the popular vote. , this is the last election in which the following counties voted for a Democratic presidential candidate: Douglas, Klamath, Lake, Harney, Wallowa, Union, Baker, Umatilla, Grant, Sherman, Polk and Yamhill.  Furthermore, Oregon would not vote for a Democratic presidential candidate again until 1988. This marks the last time that a Democratic presidential nominee has carried a majority of Oregon's counties.

Results

Results by county

See also
 United States presidential elections in Oregon

References

Oregon
1964
1964 Oregon elections